Nemić (Serbian Cyrillic: Немић) is a mountain in western Serbia, above the town of Ljubovija. Its highest peak has an elevation of 797 meters above sea level.

References

Mountains of Serbia